Majoro is an African surname. Notable people with the surname include:

Lehlohonolo Majoro (born 1986), South African footballer
Moeketsi Majoro (born 1961), Lesotho economist and politician

See also
Majoros

Surnames of African origin